Idaho Wolves were an American soccer team, founded in 2004. The team was a member of the National Premier Soccer League (NPSL), the fourth tier of the American Soccer Pyramid, for just one season. They finished their one-and-only campaign losing each of their fifteen competitive games, and scoring just eight goals, while conceding 61.

The club's colors were red and white.

Year-by-year

References

External links
 Idaho Wolves

2004 disestablishments in Idaho
2004 establishments in Idaho
Defunct soccer clubs in Idaho
National Premier Soccer League teams